Serhiy Rudyka (born 14 June 1988) is a Ukrainian footballer who plays as a midfielder.

His father Oleksandr Rudyka and uncle Oleksiy Rudyka are also former footballers.

Career
Rudyka is product of youth team system FC Metalurh Zaporizhzhia. His first coach was Y. Bulhakov. Made his debut for FC Metalurh entering as a second time playing against FC Zorya Luhansk on 3 August 2008 in Ukrainian Premier League.

References

External links
 

1988 births
Living people
Footballers from Zaporizhzhia
Ukrainian footballers
Association football midfielders
Ukraine under-21 international footballers
Ukrainian expatriate footballers
Expatriate footballers in Belarus
Expatriate footballers in Bulgaria
Ukrainian expatriate sportspeople in Belarus
Ukrainian expatriate sportspeople in Bulgaria
Ukrainian Premier League players
Ukrainian First League players
Ukrainian Second League players
First Professional Football League (Bulgaria) players
FC Metalurh Zaporizhzhia players
FC Metalurh-2 Zaporizhzhia players
FC Zorya Luhansk players
FC Metalist Kharkiv players
FC Shakhtyor Soligorsk players
FC Karpaty Lviv players
FC Mariupol players
FC Dnepr Mogilev players
FC Vereya players
FC Tavria-Skif Rozdol players